The 2011 Men's South American Volleyball Club Championship was the third official edition of the men's volleyball tournament, played by five teams over August 3 – 7, 2011 in São Paulo, Brazil. The winning team qualified for the 2011 FIVB Men's Club World Championship.

Competing clubs

Round robin

|}

|}

Final standing

References

Volleyball
Men's South American Volleyball Club Championship
Volleyball
Men's South American Volleyball Club Championship